Alfred Gibson (1874) was an Australian explorer who is believed to have died in an 1874 expedition organised by Ernest Giles, which sought to cross the deserts of Western Australia from east to west. Gibson departed from his companions on 22 April 1874 and was never seen again. The Gibson Desert into which he disappeared, was named after him by his fellow explorer.

Giles wrote:

"Here a short young man accosted me, and asked me if I did not remember him, saying at the same time that he was 'Alf'. I fancied I knew his face, but thought it was at the Peake that I had seen him, but he said "Oh no, don't you remember Alf with Bagot's sheep at the north-west bend of the Murray? My name's Alf Gibson, and I want to go out with you." I said, "Well, can you shoe? Can you ride? Can you starve? Can you go without water? And how would you like to be speared by the blacks outside?" He said he could do everything I had mentioned, and he wasn't afraid of the blacks. He was not a man I would have picked out of a mob, but men were scarce, and as he seemed so anxious to come, and as I wanted somebody, I agreed to take him."

Gibson disappeared when he left Ernest Giles with a compass and his horse, going back to fetch some water for himself, the mare and Giles, leaving Giles walking. Gibson is thought to have lost his way, and was considered dead as he did not return.

See also
List of people who disappeared

References

1851 births
1870s missing person cases
1874 deaths
Explorers of Australia
Explorers of Western Australia
Farriers
Lost explorers
Missing person cases in Australia